Jaydene Kailin Asoa Curran (born April 11, 1991) is an American mixed martial artist who competes in the strawweight division. She previously fought for  the Ultimate Fighting Championship.

Early life
Curran was born and raised in Ewa Beach, Hawaii. She attended James Campbell High School where she was a member of the wrestling team. Curran is of Samoan, Hawaiian, Irish and German descent.

Mixed martial arts career

Early career
Curran began her amateur MMA career in 2010, amassing a record of 4 wins, 1 loss and 1 No Contest over the next two years.

Curran made her professional debut in March 2013 for the Pacific Xtreme Combat promotion in her native Hawaii.  She was undefeated in her run with the company, winning all fights by unanimous decision.

Ultimate Fighting Championship
In November 2014, Curran made her Ultimate Fighting Championship (UFC) debut against Paige VanZant.  She lost the fight via TKO in the third round.  Despite the loss, she was awarded Fight of the Night honors.

In her second fight for the promotion, Curran faced Alex Chambers at UFC Fight Night: Miocic vs. Hunt.  Despite controlling the majority of the bout, Curran lost via submission in the third round.

Curran then faced Emily Kagan at UFC Fight Night: Namajunas vs. VanZant. She won the bout via submission in the second round.

Curran faced Felice Herrig at UFC on Fox: Holm vs. Shevchenko. She lost the fight via submission in the first round.

Curran then faced Jamie Moyle at The Ultimate Fighter: Tournament of Champions Finale. She lost the fight via unanimous decision.

Curran next faced Aleksandra Albu on July 29, 2017 at UFC 214. She lost the fight via unanimous decision.

Curran faced Yan Xiaonan  on 25 November 2017 at UFC Fight Night: Silva vs. Gastelum. She lost the fight by unanimous decision.
After her 4th straight loss she was released from the roster in March 2018. Her record in the promotion was 1-6.

Personal life
Curran married surfer Keanu Asing on August 13, 2017 in San Clemente, California.

Championships and accomplishments

Mixed martial arts
Ultimate Fighting Championship
Fight of the Night (One time)

Mixed martial arts record

|-
|Loss
|align=center|6–7
|Brianna Van Buren
|Submission (rear-naked choke)
| rowspan=3|Invicta Phoenix Series 1
| rowspan=3|
|align=center|2
|align=center|3:49
| rowspan=3|Kansas City, Kansas, United States
|
|-
|Win
|align=center|6–6
|Sharon Jacobson 
|Decision (unanimous)
|align=center|1
|align=center|5:00
|
|-
|Win
|align=center|5–6
|Sunna Davíðsdóttir 
|Decision (split)
|align=center|1
|align=center|5:00
|
|-
|Loss
|align=center|4–6
|Yan Xiaonan 
|Decision (unanimous)
|UFC Fight Night: Bisping vs. Gastelum
|
|align=center|3
|align=center|5:00
|Shanghai, China
|
|-
|Loss
|align=center|4–5
|Aleksandra Albu
|Decision (unanimous)
|UFC 214
|
|align=center|3
|align=center|5:00
|Anaheim, California, United States
|
|-
|Loss
|align=center|4–4
|Jamie Moyle
|Decision (unanimous)
|The Ultimate Fighter: Tournament of Champions Finale 
|
|align=center|3
|align=center|5:00
|Las Vegas, Nevada, United States
|
|-
|Loss
|align=center|4–3 
|Felice Herrig
|Submission (rear-naked choke)
|UFC on Fox: Holm vs. Shevchenko
|
|align=center|1
|align=center|1:59
|Chicago, Illinois, United States
|
|-
|Win
|align=center|4–2 
|Emily Kagan
|Submission (rear-naked choke)
|UFC Fight Night: Namajunas vs. VanZant
|
|align=center|2
|align=center|4:13
|Las Vegas, Nevada, United States
|
|-
|Loss
|align=center|3–2 
|Alex Chambers
|Submission (armbar)
|UFC Fight Night: Miocic vs. Hunt
|
|align=center|3
|align=center|3:15
|Adelaide, Australia
|
|-
|Loss
|align=center| 3–1
|Paige VanZant
| TKO (punches)
|UFC Fight Night: Edgar vs. Swanson
|
|align=center| 3
|align=center| 2:54
|Austin, Texas, United States
|
|-
|Win
| style="text-align:center;"|3–0
|Yoo Jin Jung
|Decision (unanimous)
|Pacific Xtreme Combat 42
|
| style="text-align:center;"| 3
| style="text-align:center;"| 5:00
|Mangilao, Guam
|
|-
|Win
| style="text-align:center;"|2–0
|Emi Tomimatsu
|Decision (unanimous)
|Pacific Xtreme Combat 38
|
| style="text-align:center;"| 3
| style="text-align:center;"| 5:00
|Mangilao, Guam
|
|-
|Win
| style="text-align:center;"|1–0
|Kaiyana Rain
|Decision (unanimous)
|Pacific Xtreme Combat 36
|
| style="text-align:center;"| 3
| style="text-align:center;"| 5:00
|Mangilao, Guam
|
|}

References

External links
 
 Kailin Curran at Invicta FC
 

1991 births
Mixed martial artists from Hawaii
American female mixed martial artists
Strawweight mixed martial artists
Mixed martial artists utilizing wrestling
American female sport wrestlers
Amateur wrestlers
Living people
American people of Irish descent
American people of Samoan descent
American people of German descent
American people of Native Hawaiian descent
Ultimate Fighting Championship female fighters
21st-century American women